Podkraj may refer to several places in Slovenia: 

Podkraj, Ajdovščina, a settlement in the Municipality of Ajdovščina
Podkraj, Hrastnik, a settlement in the Municipality of Hrastnik
Podkraj, Ig, a settlement in the Municipality of Ig
Podkraj, Ravne na Koroškem, a settlement in the Municipality of Ravne na Koroškem
Podkraj, Velike Lašče, a settlement in the Municipality of Velike Lašče
Podkraj, Žalec, a settlement in the Municipality of Žalece
Podkraj pri Mežici, a settlement in the Municipality of Mežica
Podkraj pri Velenju, a settlement in the Municipality of Velenje
Podkraj pri Zagorju, a settlement in the Municipality of Zagorje ob Savi
Zavrate, a settlement in the Municipality of Radeče (known as Podkraj until 1984)

and to:
Podkraj, Glamoč, a village in Bosnia and Herzegovina
Podkraj, Travnik, a village in Bosnia and Herzegovina